Finch is a 2021 American post-apocalyptic survival film directed by Miguel Sapochnik and written by Craig Luck and Ivor Powell. The film stars Tom Hanks and Caleb Landry Jones. The story follows an aging man named Finch, a survivor in a now nearly uninhabitable Earth, who builds and teaches a robot to take care of his dog when he dies.

The film was announced as BIOS in October 2017. Filming took place throughout New Mexico from February to May 2019. The film was scheduled to be released in theaters in the United States by Universal Pictures on October 2, 2020, but was delayed several times due to the COVID-19 pandemic. It was retitled Finch, sold to Apple TV+, and was released on November 5, 2021. The film received lukewarm reviews from critics, with praise given to Hanks' performance, the visuals, and overall charm, but criticism for its lack of originality and innovation within the post-apocalypse genre.

Plot
One of the few survivors, robotics engineer Finch Weinberg, lives alone with his dog Goodyear and a helper-robot Dewey in an underground St. Louis laboratory once owned by the company he worked for before the cataclysm. Finch only ventures outside to search for supplies wearing a protective suit.

Dying of an undisclosed ailment (although Finch is seen reading a book on radiation poisoning), Finch is working on creating a more advanced humanoid robot companion to take care of his dog once he is gone. Finch feeds it volumes of encyclopedic knowledge, including a manual for training and caring for dogs. However, Goodyear initially doesn't trust the robot (which eventually chooses the name Jeff).

Finch discovers that a massive storm is approaching St. Louis that will certainly destroy the area and kill him. Finch, Jeff, Dewey, and Goodyear set out in a heavily modified motorhome towards San Francisco. Because of the hasty departure, Jeff could download only 72% of his encyclopedic data, and his mental capacity requires training. Despite his condition worsening, Finch tries to teach Jeff some valuable lessons about life and how to protect Goodyear. Jeff's inquisitive behavior both amuses and frustrates Finch, but the robot slowly shows more initiative.

By the time they reach Denver, Finch becomes bedridden and Jeff decides to loot an abandoned hospital with Dewey. Dewey unwittingly gets crushed by a beartrap and Finch retrieves Jeff to escape the city, realizing that the area is a trap set up by other humans. Later in the evening, the motorhome is pursued by an unknown car (which evidently followed them from the hospital). Finch makes a panicked error in judgment and crashes their vehicle through an underpass with too little clearance, but Jeff is strong enough to squeeze it out of sight. Finch begins to give up hope that he will survive the journey and tells a story (in a flashback) about how he rescued Goodyear.

Approaching their destination, the UV radiation has dropped low enough for Finch to be able to step out into the sunshine without a protective suit. Ecstatic, Finch spends an afternoon outside with Jeff, teaching him how to play fetch with Goodyear before quietly dying. After cremating Finch in a funeral pyre, Jeff and Goodyear make their way to San Francisco. Although they find the city habitable but deserted, they find possible evidence of surviving humans at the Golden Gate Bridge and set out to find them.

Cast
 Tom Hanks as Finch Weinberg
 Caleb Landry Jones as Jeff
 Seamus as Goodyear

Additionally, Samira Wiley, Skeet Ulrich, Laura Harrier, and Alexis Raben were all set to appear in the film, but their roles were cut from the final version.

Production
On October 26, 2017, it was announced that Tom Hanks would star in BIOS, a post-apocalyptic film about a robot who is built by Hanks' ailing character Finch to protect the life of his beloved dog when he dies. Miguel Sapochnik would direct the film, which would be produced by Robert Zemeckis and Kevin Misher, from a spec script by Craig Luck and Ivor Powell. Several major studios were bidding for the rights of the film, with production expected to begin in early 2018. A few days later, it was reported that Amblin Entertainment had purchased the project, with Universal Pictures set to distribute it. In December 2017, the film was revealed to be on that year's "Black List" of most-liked unproduced screenplays.

In January 2019, Caleb Landry Jones joined the cast in a motion capture and voice role as the robot which Finch builds. In March 2019, Samira Wiley was announced as part of the cast, followed by Skeet Ulrich and Laura Harrier in May, but were all absent in the released film.

Principal photography began in February 2019, in Albuquerque, New Mexico. Filming also took place in Santa Fe, Shiprock, Los Lunas, Socorro, and the White Sands National Monument, and ended in May 2019.

Deleted extended ending
Speaking of cutting the last section of the film, Sapochnik said:

Release
In May 2018, the film was scheduled to be released in theaters by Universal Pictures on October 2, 2020. In June 2020, due to the ongoing COVID-19 pandemic shutting down theaters worldwide, it was delayed to April 16, 2021. In January 2021, it was moved to August 13, 2021, and in March, it was moved a week later to August 20.

In May 2021, it was announced that the film had been retitled from BIOS to Finch and bought by Apple TV+ for a release on November 5, 2021, while Universal Pictures Home Entertainment would also retain home entertainment and linear television rights to the film. According to Samba TV, the film was watched in 1.4 million households in its first 30 days of release.

Reception
 Metacritic assigned the film a weighted average score of 57 out of 100, based on 38 critics, indicating "mixed or average reviews".

Tomris Laffly of Variety gave the film a positive review: "Despite the bleak backdrop, Finch manages to stay true to the fuzzy ring of its basic idea, delivering a family-friendly movie that is big-hearted, comfortingly traditional and bolstered by a genuine love of dogs." David Rooney of The Hollywood Reporter gave it a mixed review: "There's little that's unpredictable in Miguel Sapochnik's unabashedly sentimental sci-fi road movie, which could almost have been assembled in a robotics lab from the durable parts of countless movies past. But darned if I wasn't misting up in the melancholy climactic scenes." Richard Schertzer of Sportskeeda commented, "Finch proves to be a decent watch but it often gets lost in other science-fiction movies, living in their shadow, rather than doing something new."

Accolades

References

External links
 
 Finch on Apple TV+
 

2021 drama films
2021 science fiction films
2020s American films
2020s drama road movies
2020s English-language films
2020s science fiction drama films
2020s survival films
Amblin Entertainment films
American drama road movies
American post-apocalyptic films
American robot films
American science fiction drama films
American survival films
Apple TV+ original films
Films not released in theaters due to the COVID-19 pandemic
Films produced by Robert Zemeckis
Films scored by Gustavo Santaolalla
Films set in Denver
Films set in San Francisco
Films set in St. Louis
Films shot in New Mexico
Films using motion capture
ImageMovers films
Reliance Entertainment films
Walden Media films